Ziduri is a commune in Buzău County, Muntenia, Romania. It is composed of six villages: Costieni, Cuculeasa, Heliade Rădulescu, Lanurile, Ziduri and Zoița.

Notes

Communes in Buzău County
Localities in Muntenia